Bithynia leachii is species of small freshwater snail with an operculum, an aquatic prosobranch gastropod mollusk in the family Bithyniidae.

Distribution 
It is a Palearctic species found in North Africa and Europe to East Siberia. 
 Czech Republic – near Morava River and near Thaya river in the southernmost Moravia near Hlohovec, Kostice and Tvrdonice, critically endangered (CR)
 Germany – high endangered (Stark gefährdet)
 Netherlands
 Poland
 Slovakia – in Danube drainage basin (mainly in Žitný ostrov) and in Tisza drainage basin
 Sweden
 Great Britain
 Ireland
 Hungary

Shell description
The width of the shell is 3–7 mm. The height of the shell is 4–8 mm. The colour is brown or grey. There are 4 to 4.5 very convex whorls forming a short cone with a very deep suture in comparison to Bithynia tentaculata. The spire is shorter and less sharp than in Bithynia tentaculata. The aperture and operculum upside are smoothly rounded. The aperture is without a sharp point on the upper corner.

Habitat
This species requires clean, calcium-rich water, which is slow-running and thickly weeded.

Parasites
Parasites of Bithynia leachii include:
 Prosthogonimidae: Bithynia leachii can act as first intermediate host for Prosthogonimus ovatus.
 Opisthorchiidae: Bithynia leachii serves as the first intermediate host for Opisthorchis felineus.

References

External links 

 Bithynia leachii Species account and photograph at Mollusc Ireland.

Bithyniidae
Gastropods described in 1823
Palearctic molluscs